

2013

See also
 2013 in Australia
 2013 in Australian television
 List of 2013 box office number-one films in Australia

2013
Lists of 2013 films by country or language
Films